Dermot Heaney (born 27 July 1971) is a former Gaelic footballer who played for the Derry county team in the 1990s and early 2000s. He part of Derry's 1993 All-Ireland Championship winning side, also winning Ulster Senior Football Championships in 1993 and 1998. He usually played in the half-forward line, although sometimes played in midfield. Heaney played club football with St Malachy's GAC Castledawson.

Playing career

Inter-county
Henaey as a teenager was known as a football prodigy. He played Minor football for Derry for three years from 1987 to 1989. In 1989 he was full forward on the team won the Ulster Minor Football Championship and All-Ireland Minor Championship.

He was part of Derry's National League winning team in 1992, playing in midfield. Heaney was awarded the Ulster Tennent's GAA Writers' Association Monthly Merit Award for April 1992 for his performances in the latter stages of the league. The following year he was part of Derry's Ulster Senior Championship and All-Ireland Championship winning side, playing full-forward in the Ulster final and right half forward in the All-Ireland final.

He won a further three National League medals in 1995, 1996 and 2000 and a second Ulster Senior Championship in 1998.

Club
Heaney starting playing with the Castledawson Senior team when he was 15, and reached two Derry Senior Football Championship finals (1989 and 1997) in his career, but finished on the losing side in both, to Newbridge and Dungiven respectively. Prior to this Heaney won Derry Minor 'B' Football Championship and League (11 a-side) medals. He also won the Larkin Cup with the club.

Province
Heaney was part of four Railway Cup winning Ulster sides.

School 
Heaney attended St Pius X College, Magherafelt, and won two Ulster and two All-Ireland U-16 Vocational Schools Championships.

Honours

County
All-Ireland Senior Football Championship - Winner (1): 1993
National Football League - Winner (4): 1992, 1995, 1996, 2000
National Football League - Runner up: 1998
Ulster Senior Football Championship - Winner (2): 1993, 1998
Ulster Senior Football Championship - Runner up: 1992, 2000
Dr McKenna Cup - Winner (1): 1993/1999??
All-Ireland Minor Football Championship - Winner (1): 1989
Ulster Minor Football Championship - Winner (1): 1989

Club
Derry Senior Football Championship - Runner up: 1989, 1997
Larkin Cup - Winner (1?): Year?
Derry Minor 'B' Football Championship (11 a-side) - Winner (1): Year?
Derry Minor 'B' Football League (11 a-side) - Winner (1): Year?
Underage awards

Province
Railway Cup - Winner (4): Years?

School
All-Ireland U-16 Vocational Schools Championship - Winner (2): Years?
Ulster U-16 Vocational Schools Championship - Winner (2): Years?

Individual
All Star - Nominated (runner up): Year?

Note: The above lists may be incomplete. Please add any other honours you know of.

References

External links
Interview with Hogan Stand magazine
Player focus on Dermot Heaney (Click on Dermot Heaney)
There's more to Heaney than heft - Irish Independent article on Heaney (by Kevin Kimmage)
St Malachy's GAC Castledawson website

1971 births
Living people
Derry inter-county Gaelic footballers
Ulster inter-provincial Gaelic footballers
Winners of one All-Ireland medal (Gaelic football)